Ruyle Township is one of eleven townships in Jersey County, Illinois, United States.  As of the 2010 census, its population was 421 and it contained 162 housing units.

Geography

Unincorporated towns
 Kemper

Adjacent townships
 Rockbridge Township, Greene County (north)
 Western Mound Township, Macoupin County (northeast)
 Chesterfield Township, Macoupin County (east)
 Shipman Township, Macoupin County (southeast)
 Fidelity Township (south)
 Jersey Township (southwest)

Cemeteries
The township contains these five cemeteries: Elliott, Kemper, Medora, Oakland and Pruitt.

Major highways
  Illinois Route 267

Demographics

School districts
 Greenfield Community Unit School District 10
 Jersey Community Unit School District 100
 Southwestern Community Unit School District 9

Political districts
 Illinois's 19th congressional district
 State House District 97
 State Senate District 49

See also
 Doc Bennett

References
 
 United States Census Bureau 2007 TIGER/Line Shapefiles
 United States National Atlas

External links
 City-Data.com
 Illinois State Archives

Townships in Jersey County, Illinois
Townships in Illinois